St Thomas à Becket Church may refer to many churches in the United Kingdom, named for Saint Thomas Becket (also known as Thomas à Becket):

St Thomas à Becket Church, Widcombe, Bath
Church of St Thomas à Becket, Box, Wiltshire
St Thomas the Martyr, Bristol
Church of St Thomas à Becket, Capel, Kent
St Thomas of Canterbury Church, Chester
Church of St Thomas of Canterbury, Clapham, Bedfordshire
Church of St Thomas, Dudley, West Midlands
St Thomas of Canterbury, Elsfield, Oxfordshire
Church of St Thomas à Becket, Church of St Thomas a Becket
St Thomas' Church, Southwark, London
Church of St Thomas the Martyr, Newcastle upon Tyne
Sts Thomas Minster, Newport, Isle of Wight, which may ambiguously have St Thomas à Becket or St Thomas the Apostle as its patron
Church of St Thomas à Becket, Newton Tracey
St Thomas à Becket Church, Northaw
St Thomas the Martyr's Church, Oxford
St Thomas à Becket Church, Pensford, Somerset
Cathedral Church of St Thomas of Canterbury, commonly known as Portsmouth Cathedral, Portsmouth
St Thomas à Becket Church, Puddington, Devon
Church of St Thomas à Becket, Pylle, Somerset
Church of St Thomas à Becket, Ramsey, Cambridgeshire
Church of St Thomas a Becket, Shirenewton, Monmouthshire, Wales
Church of St Thomas à Becket, South Cadbury, Somerset
Church of St Thomas à Becket, Sutton-under-Brailes, Warwickshire
Church of St Thomas à Becket, Tilshead, Wiltshire
Church of St Thomas the Martyr, Up Holland, Lancashire
St Thomas à Becket Church, Warblington, Hampshire
Church of St Thomas à Becket, Wolvesnewton, Monmouthshire
a church ruin and Grade I listed building replaced by Holy Trinity Church, Thorpe Thewles

See also
St Thomas à Becket Chapel, Milford Haven